Pemberton v. Tallahassee Memorial Regional Center, 66 F. Supp. 2d 1247 (N.D. Fla. 1999), is a case in the United States regarding reproductive rights. In particular, the case explored the limits of a woman's right to choose her medical treatment in light of fetal rights at the end of pregnancy.

Pemberton had a previous c-section (vertical incision), and with her second child attempted to have a VBAC (vaginal birth after c-section).  However, since she could not find any doctor to assist her in this endeavor, she labored at home, with a midwife.

When a doctor she had approached about a related issue at the Tallahassee Memorial Regional Center found out, he and the hospital sued to force her to get a c-section. The court held that the rights of the fetus at or near birth outweighed the rights of Pemberton to determine her own medical care.  She was physically forced to stop laboring, and taken to the hospital, where a c-section was performed.

Her suit against the hospital was dismissed.  The court held that a cesarean section at the end of a full-term pregnancy was here deemed to be medically necessary by doctors to avoid a substantial risk that the fetus would die during delivery due to uterine rupture, a risk of 4-6% according to the hospital's doctors and 2% according to Pemberton's doctors.   Furthermore, the court held that a state's interest in preserving the life of an unborn child outweighed the mother's constitutional interest of bodily integrity.  The court held that Roe v. Wade was not applicable, because bearing an unwanted child is a greater intrusion on the mother's constitutional interests than undergoing a cesarean section to deliver a child that the mother affirmatively desires to deliver.  The court further distinguished In re A.C. by stating that it left open the possibility that a non-consenting patient's interest would yield to a more compelling countervailing interest in an "extremely rare and truly exceptional case."  The court then held this case to be such.

Later case involving Tallahassee
In March 2009, Samantha Burton through her pro bono attorney, David H. Abrams, filed an appeal of a Leon County Circuit Court order forcing her to remain in Tallahassee Memorial Hospital and to submit to any medical care deemed necessary for the health of her fetus. The ACLU and the ACLU of Florida filed a friend-of-the-court brief against the state of Florida (Burton vs. Florida) opposing the Court's decision to force a pregnant woman to remain hospitalized at Tallahassee Memorial Hospital against her will and prohibiting her from getting a second opinion.  State Attorney, Willie Meggs, who appointed counsel for Tallahassee Memorial Hospital as a special prosecutor to represent the State at the trial court level justified the intervention by stating: " "When it involves an unborn child we become the representative of the child when nobody else will represent it."

See also
 Samantha Burton v. State of Florida

References

External links
 
 Rights Duties, and the Body, by Rosamund Scott
 The Rest of the Story
 Laura Pemberton: Speaking on Her Experience of a Court-ordered Cesarian Surgery

Legal issues in pregnancy
United States privacy case law
United States reproductive rights case law
United States district court cases
1999 in United States case law
1999 in Florida
History of women in Florida